Geffen or Gefen may refer to:

Geffen (surname)
Gefen, a moshav in central Israel
Gefen LLC, an American electronics hardware manufacturing company
Gefen Publishing House, an English language publishing firm located in Jerusalem, Israel
The Geffen Film Company, a motion picture distributor and production company founded by David Geffen
Geffen Records, a record label founded by David Geffen
Geffen Playhouse, a theater in Los Angeles, California, named after David Geffen
Geffen, Netherlands, a town in the Dutch municipality of Oss
Geffen (Ragnarok Online), a town in the fantasy world of Ragnarok Online